The Football Conference season of 1999–2000 was the twenty-first season of the Football Conference, also known as the Nationwide Conference for sponsorship reasons.

Changes since the previous season
 Altrincham (promoted 1998–99)
 Nuneaton Borough (promoted 1998–99)
 Scarborough (relegated from the Football League 1998–99)
 Sutton United (promoted 1998–99)

Locations

Final league table

Results

Top scorers in order of league goals

 Footballtransfers.co.uk, thefootballarchives.com and Soccerbase contain information on many playerson whom there is not yet an article in Wikipedia.
Source:

References

External links
 Official Football Conference Website
 1999-00 Conference National Results

1999-2000
5
English